Calamagrostis lapponica, the Lappland reedgrass, is a grass species native to colder parts of the Northern Hemisphere. It has been reported from Scandinavia, Russia, Greenland, Alaska, and every Canadian province and territory except the Maritime Provinces (Nova Scotia, New Brunswick and Prince Edward Island).

Calamagrostis lapponica is an herb growing up to 60 cm (24 inches) tall. It spreads by means of short underground rhizomes. Panicle is up to 15 cm (6 inches) long, frequently purple.

References

lapponica
Flora of Russia
Flora of Canada
Flora of Alaska
Flora of Greenland
Flora of Norway
Flora of Finland
Flora of Sweden
Flora without expected TNC conservation status